Change Myself is Japanese pop musician Iconiq's debut album, released on March 10, 2010. The album was initially planned for a February 24 release, which was postponed for two weeks.

Background

Iconiq originally released music in Japan and South Korea as the leader of the girl-group Sugar. Iconiq released two solo singles under the name Ahyoomee in Korea in 2006, with Sugar disbanding in December 2006. In 2008, Iconiq moved to West Hollywood, California to study at dance and vocal schools. Iconiq cites this trip for the inspiration for the change/rebirth theme of her Japanese debut.

Iconiq returned to Japan in 2009, signed as an artist to Avex Entertainment. The stage name Iconiq was chosen for her re-debut, due to its strong impact and personal meaning/goal, "to become an icon for the era." believing the name had strong impact.

Promotion

Large-scale billboards showcasing Iconiq's hairstyle started appearing in Japanese city centres in late November, 2009. At the same time, her song "I'm Lovin' You" (a duet with Exile vocalist Atsushi) started airing in commercials for Shiseido's Maquillage cosmetics line, featuring actress Juri Ueno.

"I'm Lovin' You" was announced as Iconiq's debut digital single, first released as a ringtone at Recochoku on December 9. The ringtone was the most popular at Recochoku for an entire week, the first time a debut artist has achieved this. By late January, the song had been downloaded as a ringtone approximately 300,000 times. On January 27, the song was simultaneously released as a cellphone digital download, as well as a special rental store only single.

Iconiq's second Maquillage commercial for Shiseido featured her personally, and was first announced in a press conference with a mini-live on the 19th of January. The new commercial song, "Change Myself," was produced by Hiro, who is known for producing such artists like Kumi Koda and Namie Amuro. The change concept and catch-phrase are directly related to the lyrics of the song, such as the chorus line . The song was released as a ringtone through Recochoku on the 20th, and the commercial began airing on the 21st. Much like its predecessor, the song debuted at #1 on Recochoku's weekly ranking chart. It was released as a download to cellphones on March 3. "Bye Now!" followed as Iconiq's third Maquillage commercial in late February.

Starting a day before the album's release, Iconiq was the featured spokesperson for All Nippon Airways, US fashion brand Kitson, Italian car manufacturer Maserati, Rhythm Zone, music download site Mu-Mo, Shiseido and Starbucks. This was the first time a single person had promoted seven companies simultaneously in Japan. Each commercial was marketed with Iconiq's marketing phrase "I change. I change through music"; however, the company name replaced "music" in each instance.

Iconiq also appeared in many fashion and music centred magazines, most notably on the cover of Gingers February 2010 issue. She also featured in publications such as Anan, Barfout!, Bea's Up, Classy, Flava, Frau, Gekkan Exile, Glamorous, Jelly, Junon, Nikkan Entertainment, Sōen, Tokyo Headline, Vivi and Voce.

Chart reception

In the album's first week, it debuted at #3 on Oricon's album charts, selling 32,000 copies. This was the first top three position debut album since Yui Aragaki's Sora in late 2007. The album one further week in the top 10, eventually charting in the top 300 albums for 10 weeks, and selling a total of 63,000 copies.

Each digital single had moderate charting success. "I'm Lovin' You" reached #8 on RIAJ's full-length cellphone download Digital Track Chart in February. "Change Myself"'s special edit version charted at #20, with the full-length version later peaking at #34. "Change Myself" also received minor airplay the week of the album's release, enough to reach #73 on Billboards Japan Hot 100 chart. "Bye Now!" saw success on Billboard, peaking at #8 during the album's promotion due to strong airplay. It did not chart as highly as the other singles on the digital track charts, peaking at #47 (with the special edited version peaking at #49).

A special medley of the three promotional singles used in Shiseido Maquillage commercials saw minor digital success, peaking at #58.

Track listing

Chart rankings

Reported sales

Release history

References

2010 debut albums
Avex Group albums
Japanese-language albums